Urta-Yelga (Urtayılğa) is a rural locality (a village) in Nizhnesikiyazovsky Selsoviet, Baltachevsky District, Bashkortostan, Russia. The population was 46 as of 2010. There are 2 streets.

Geography 
Urta-Yelga is located 15 km north of Starobaltachevo (the district's administrative centre) by road. Tashly-Yelga is the nearest rural locality.

References 

Rural localities in Baltachevsky District